Clash of the Tartans is the second album by the band The Real McKenzies, originally released in 1998 (see 1998 in music). "Mainland" was the selected single, with an accompanying video directed by Danny Novak.

Track listing
"Stone of Kings" (Real McKenzies, Walker) – 2:35
"Thistle Boy" (Priske, Real McKenzies ...) – 2:29
"Mainland" (Walker) – 3:56
"Kings o' Glasgow" (Chapman, Real McKenzies ...) – 3:24
"Will Ye Be Proud" (MacLeod) – 2:38
"Ceilidh" (McKenzie) – 2:28
"Wild Mountain Thyme" (Francis McPeake) – 1:45
"Pagan Holiday" (Walker) – 3:43
"Scots Wha' Ha'e" (Burns, Priske, Walker) – 2:53
"Bastards" (McKenzie, Robertson) – 2:30
"McPherson's Rant" (Robert Burns, Real McKenzies) – 2:56
"To the Battle" (McKenzies, Walker) – 3:46
"Auld Lang Syne" (Robert Burns) – 2:11
"MacLeod" (Macleod) – 2:57

Personnel 

Brian "Who" Else – Engineer
Randy "Tex" Iwata – Layout Design, Cover Design
Paul McKenzie – Vocals
Kurt Robertson - Guitars
Rich Priske - Bass
Anthony "Tony Balony" Walker - Guitars L.Vocal on Mainland, Will ye be Proud
Glenn Kruger "McKruger" – Drums
Alan MacLeod – Bagpipes, Spoken Word
Mike MacDonald – Bagpipes
Shannon Saunders – Accordion, Backing Vocals (Mainland)
Alex Waterhouse-Hayward – Cover Photo
Neil Williams – Assistant Engineer

References

1998 albums
The Real McKenzies albums
Sudden Death Records albums